NFP may refer to:

Political parties
 National Fascist Party, Italian Partito Nazionale Fascista
 National Federation Party, Fiji's oldest party
 National Freedom Party, South Africa
 New Frontier Party (Japan),

Other organizations
 National Family Partnership, a US organization formerly known as the National Federation of Parents for Drug Free Youth
 Nebraskans For Peace
 Not-for-profit, nonprofit organizations
 Nurse-Family Partnership, a US non-profit organization that arranges home visits from nurses to mothers

People
 Nadeem F. Paracha, Pakistani journalist and author

Other uses
 Natural family planning, birth control methods
 Nonfarm payrolls, an economic indicator released monthly by the US Department of Labor
 Northern Ford Premiership, an English rugby league competition
 Net factor payments, an economic measurement, see factor income
 Netherlands Fractal Pattern

See also
 National Front Party (disambiguation)
 New Frontier Party (disambiguation)
 Ninth Five-Year Plan (disambiguation)
 North Fork Pass (disambiguation)